Bramley Corner is a village in Hampshire, England.

Governance
The village of Bramley Corner is part of the civil parish of Bramley. The village is also part of the Bramley and Sherfield ward of Basingstoke and Deane borough council. The borough council is a Non-metropolitan district of Hampshire County Council. All three councils are responsible for different aspects of local government.

References

External links

Villages in Hampshire